Harvard University's Collection of Historical Scientific Instruments (CHSI), established 1948, is "one of the three largest university collections of its kind in the world".  Waywiser, the online catalog of the collection, lists over 60% of the collection's 20,000 objects . The collection was originally curated by Mr. David P Wheatland in his office to prevent obsolete equipment from being cannibalized for its component parts and materials.

A selection of instruments and artifacts from the collection comprise the exhibition "Time, Life, & Matter: Science in Cambridge." This permanent display can be found in the Putnam Gallery on the first floor of the Harvard Science Center, which is free and open to the public during regularly scheduled hours, Sunday through Friday. In addition, rotating collaborative exhibitions drawn in part from the collection are shown in the Special Exhibitions Gallery on the second floor, as well as the more modest Foyer Gallery on the third floor.

The CHSI includes a number of scientific instruments and demonstration apparatus purchased circa 1765 under the advice of Benjamin Franklin, to replace original equipment which had been lost in a disastrous fire which also destroyed the university's library in the original Harvard Hall. This group includes apparatus for experimenting with electricity, as well as demonstrating the laws of physics as they were understood in the late 18th century.

Other highlights of the permanent exhibit include a fine assemblage of sundials (part the largest private collection in North America), a geometrical compass designed by Galileo Galilei, and the control console from the former Harvard Cyclotron Laboratory.

One of the larger items in the collection is the Harvard Mark I, a historic room-sized electromechanical computer commissioned in 1944,  which was exhibited next to the central stairwell in the main lobby of the Science Center, and has since been moved to the Harvard John A. Paulson School of Engineering and Applied Sciences.

The collection continues to be expanded, under the guidance of David P. Wheatland Curator Sara J. Schechner. Originally a part of the Harvard Library system, the CHSI is now presented under the auspices of Harvard's Department of the History of Science, and is one of the four Harvard Museums of Science and Culture.
The CHSI is also affiliated with the American Alliance of Museums.

A strategic plan has been developed to expand the CHSI's missions of preservation, education, research, and display, including expanded educational outreach and higher-profile public exhibitions.

External links

References 

Harvard University museums
Scientific instruments
History museums in Massachusetts
Science museums in Massachusetts
Institutions accredited by the American Alliance of Museums